Jeroen Brand (born 3 April 1982) is a Dutch cricketer. He made his List A cricket debut in the 2015 ICC World Cricket League Division Two tournament for the Netherlands against Kenya on 21 January 2015.

References

External links
 

1982 births
Living people
Dutch cricketers
Sportspeople from The Hague